Meshulam Dovid Soloveitchik ( also known as Reb Dovid or Rav Dovid; 21 October 1921 – 31 January 2021) was a Haredi rabbi and rosh yeshiva of one of the branches of the Brisk yeshivas in Jerusalem.

Early life
Meshulam Dovid Soloveitchik was the fifth of twelve children and the third son born to Yitzchok Zev Soloveitchik and Alte Hindl, daughter of Chaim Auerbach (not to be confused with Chaim Yehuda Leib Auerbach). His exact date of his birth is unknown: some sources state his birth on 19 Tishrei 5682 which would be 21 October 1921, while others say he was born in 1922. He was named "Meshulam" after his maternal great grandfather, Meshulam Auerbach (who had also proposed the shidduch between his parents), and "Dovid" after his maternal grandmother's second husband, Dovid Mintz.

Soloveitchik learned in the Kamenitz Yeshiva under Boruch Ber Leibovitz. At age 19, Soloveitchik emigrated to Mandatory Palestine with his father during World War II, and they settled in Jerusalem. He married Yehudis the daughter of Asher Sternbuch of London. He was the brother-in-law of Moshe Sternbuch, Chanoch Ehrentreu and Yitzchok Arieli.

Rosh yeshiva

In the late 1970s, Soloveitchik opened his yeshiva in the Gush Shemonim section of the Givat Moshe neighborhood of Jerusalem, and served  there as rosh yeshiva (dean). Brisk yeshivas in Israel are attended by select young Talmudists, mainly from the United States.

He did not personally publish any works on the Talmud, but many of his works have been published by his students, especially in the latest Mishor prints of his father's works. He rarely gave approbations to new books.

Soloveitchik was considered by Briskers to be one of the last authentic remnants of a pre-World War II Jewish Lithuania, and is often quoted for his memories of his father's and grandfather's lives and teachings.

Family
Soloveitchik's eldest son, Yitzchok Zev Soloveitchik (II), who is the son in-law of Berel Povarsky, was a maggid shiur (lecturer) in his father's yeshiva. When Meshulam Dovid died, Yitzchok Zev became the rosh yeshiva.

Soloveitchik's daughter Hendel is married to Nechemya Kaplan, rosh yeshiva of Yeshiva Shaar HaTalmud in Jerusalem.

Death
Soloveitchik died on 31 January 2021 at the age of 99, with ten thousand mourners turning out to attend his funeral. He was buried beside his father on Har Hamenuchos.

It was announced at the funeral, that in accordance with the wishes of the deceased, his oldest son Yitzchok Zev will succeed his father as rosh yeshiva of Brisk.

Works
 Chidushei Rabbeinu Meshulem Dovid Halevi (Published in part on the first anniversary of his passing)
 Shiurei Rabbeinu Meshulam Dovid HaLevi (written by students):
 Nazir
 Arachin
 Zevachim Part 1
 Zevachim Part 2 
 Zevachim Part 3
 Al Hatorah (2 Vol.)
 Drashos Mussar U'Tefila
 מאמר שעת השמד [Speech Against the Impending Draft of Bnei Torah]

Notable students
 Eliezer Geldzahler (1958-2004), rosh yeshiva of Yeshiva Ohr Yisroel in Brooklyn, New York.
 Chaim Yosef Goldberg (1948-2016), a renowned Gabbai Tzedokka in Israel.
 Yitzchok Lichtenstein, rosh yeshiva of Torah Vodaas
 Moshe Twersky (1955-2014) maggid shiur in Yeshiva Toras Moshe
 Shraga Feivel Zimmerman, av beit din of the Federation of Synagogues in London

Brisker rabbinic dynasty

References

Sources
rabbi Meshulam Dovid Soloveitchik Stories about his father with reb yonatan shtencel

1921 births
2021 deaths
Anti-Zionist Haredi rabbis
Haredi rabbis in Israel
Israeli people of Belarusian-Jewish descent
Rabbis of the Edah HaChareidis
Rosh yeshivas
Soloveitchik rabbinic dynasty
Deaths from the COVID-19 pandemic in Israel
20th-century rabbis in Jerusalem
21st-century rabbis in Jerusalem
Rabbis from Brest, Belarus